Jonathan Fairbanks (1594 – December 5, 1668) was an English colonist born in Heptonstall, Halifax, in the West Riding of Yorkshire, England who immigrated to New England in 1633. Around 1641 Fairbanks built the Fairbanks House in Dedham, Massachusetts which is today the oldest surviving wood-framed house in North America.

Family
Fairbanks married Grace Smith in Halifax on May 20, 1617.  Together they had six children.  To celebrate the Fairbanks' 400th wedding anniversary, the Fairbanks Family in America offered half price admission to the house, as well as wedding cake and popcorn on May 20, 2017.

Settlement in New England
Jonathan Fairbanks arrived in Boston, Massachusetts Bay Colony, with his family in 1633. The Fairbanks family remained in Boston about three years, before settling in Dedham, as one of the earliest settler families. The family purchased 12 acres of land, and in 1641 master carpenters began constructing their home.  Jonathan Fairbanks signed the Covenant when the town was founded and named. He served a single term as selectman in 1658.

Conversion to Christianity

Jonathan Fairbanks had "long stood off from the church upon some scruples about public profession of faith and the covenant, yet after divers loving conferences..., [In 1646] he made such a declaration of his faith and conversion to God and profession of subjection to the ordinances of Christ in the church that he was readily and gladly received by the whole church." Fairbanks became a member of the First Church in Dedham, which espoused a Reformed theology (Calvinist) in the seventeenth century.

Jonathan Fairbanks died in Dedham, December 5, 1668. Grace Fairbanks died either October 28, 1673; or March 19, 1676. Fairbanks was buried in the Old Village Cemetery.

As was common at the time Jonathan used several spellings of his surname: Fairbanke, Fairebanke, Fayerbanke, and on his will Fairbanck. His sons and grandsons began spelling the name Fairbank or Fairbanks. The spelling Fairbanks carried on for 15 generations.

See also 
Thaddeus Fairbanks

References

Works cited

External links
Will of Jonathan Fairbanks, 1668
The Fairbanks Family in America by Lorenzo Sayles Fairbanks, 1897

People from Halifax, West Yorkshire
1594 births
1668 deaths
People from colonial Dedham, Massachusetts
Kingdom of England emigrants to Massachusetts Bay Colony
Dedham, Massachusetts selectmen
Signers of the Dedham Covenant
Burials at Old Village Cemetery
People from West Yorkshire